This is a list of named minor planets in an alphabetical, case-insensitive order grouped by the first letter of their name. New namings, typically proposed by the discoverer and approved by the Working Group Small Body Nomenclature (WGSBN) of the International Astronomical Union, are published nowadays in their WGSBN Bulletin and summarized in a dedicated list several times a year.

Over the last four decades, the list has grown significantly with an average rate of 492 new namings published every year (or 1.35 namings per day). While in March 1979, only 1924 minor planets had received a name and completed the designation process, the list contains 23,542 named objects. Of all these minor-planet names, 1266 contain diacritical marks.

See also 
 List of minor planet discoverers
 List of minor planets named after animals and plants
 List of minor planets named after people
 List of minor planets named after places
 List of minor planets named after rivers
 List of observatory codes

Notes

References 
 

Lists of minor planets by name
Minor planets by name